Brigadier Roderick Ferguson Semple  (26 January 1922 – 31 July 2003) was a British Army officer who became Director SAS.

Military career
Educated at Aberdeen Grammar School and Aberdeen University, Semple was commissioned into the Royal Engineers in 1942. He served in World War II with the 6th Airborne Divisional Engineers creating Glider Landing Zones in the Airborne landings in Normandy in June 1944. He received the MC for this.

He went on to be Chief of Staff for 16 Parachute Brigade before becoming Commanding Officer of 131 Parachute Engineer Regiment. He was appointed Director SAS in 1969 before retiring in 1972.

In retirement he became Director-General of Administration in the Omani Department of Defence and a member of the Sultan's National Defence Council. The Airborne Engineers Association still holds an annual Fergie Semple Golf Competition in his honour.

Family
He was married to Olivia; there were no children.

References

1922 births
2003 deaths
People educated at Aberdeen Grammar School
Alumni of the University of Aberdeen
Royal Engineers officers
Members of the Order of the British Empire
Recipients of the Military Cross
Special Air Service officers
British Army personnel of World War II
British Army brigadiers